The Brooker Highway is a highway in the State of Tasmania, Australia. As one of Hobart's 3 major radials, the highway connects traffic from the Hobart city centre with the northern suburbs and is the major road connection to the cities and towns of Northern Tasmania. With an AADT of 48,000, the highway is one of the busiest in Tasmania. The Brooker Highway has recently been declared part of the National Highway.

It is primarily a four lane (dual-carriageway) highway, and apart from the Domain Highway junction, only the northern sections of the highway have grade separated junctions. The remainder of the junctions are regulated by traffic light and roundabout intersections.

While the highway is substantially less congested than in other states during peak hours, it is more congested off-peak than roads in Queensland, Western Australia, and almost as congested as those in New South Wales. It is thus a busy road by any Australian standard. The Brooker Highway is currently below the acceptable levels of service and congestion issues are expected to worsen significantly over the next 20 years with the Highway already approaching its designed capacity. A current proposal to convert the Southern Railway Line for use as a Light rail system has the potential to alleviate the Brooker Highway's traffic problems.

History

The first stage of the Brooker Avenue was constructed as a dual carriageway four-lane road in 1954 between Risdon Road, New Town, and Elwick Road, Glenorchy. The north-bound and south-bound roads were divided by a wide median strip with trees planted at intervals. At various points the median strip was dissected by a short roadway to enable traffic to U-turn to the opposite direction. 

In 1957 work began on extending the road into Hobart city. This work dissected part of the former racecourse grounds at Cornelian Bay, and the obliteration of Batman Place which was the location of huts built for affordable housing. The road was built on an embankment which crossed the Main Line Railway and Bellevue Parade via a concrete bridge. The road skirted around the edge of the Queens Domain to an area known as Cleary's Gates. At the intersection with the Domain Highway, a grade-separated intersection was completed which is commonly known as the 'clover-leaf'. Between here and the city the new road consumed much of Park Street.  

At Liverpool St a new roundabout, named 'Railway roundabout' (as it was adjacent to Hobart Passenger Rail Terminal), was completed in 1960. In 1965, the Hobart Area Transportation Study was released and entailed large development plans for the Brooker Highway, that included extension as far as Granton. By 1966 the road was extended from Elwick Road to the Main Road at Berriedale. This entailed some shoreline reclamation works at Montrose Bay. 

In 1977 the highway was further extended, taking the road from a new interchange at Berriedale Road to the Claremont Link Road. This section was initially a single-lane road each-way but with a third climbing lane in the north direction. In 1981 the final section between Claremont Link Road and Midland Highway at Granton was commenced. This was opened in 1983 as a single-lane road each-way, and with a long climbing lane in the south direction, commencing from Black Snake Lane and merging in near Hilton Road, in Austins Ferry. In 1992 the four-lane dual carriageway highway that stands today was completed through to Granton and the Bridgewater bridge. 

The Brooker Highway was built as a replacement to the original Midland Highway route between Hobart city and Granton, which passed along Elizabeth Street, New Town Road and Main Road, through the built up areas of New Town, Moonah, Glenorchy, Rosetta, Montrose, Claremont and Berriedale.
This was the first major highway construction in the Hobart City region, and was named  Brooker Highway, after the Minister for Transport at the time of the conception of the project, Edward Brooker. Although the road's formal name is Brooker Avenue, it is more commonly referred to as Brooker Highway whilst the section between Berriedale and Granton is often referred to as the Northern Outlet.

Timeline

 1954: Stage One: Risdon Road, New Town - Elwick Road, Glenorchy.
 1959: Stage Two: Risdon Road, New Town - Liverpool St, CBD (Railway Roundabout completed 1960).
 1966: Stage Three: Elwick Road, Glenorchy - Main Road, Berriedale.
 1977: Stage Four: Main Road, Berriedale - Claremont Link Road, Claremont (single carriageway with north climbing lane).
 1983: Stage Five: Claremont Link Road, Claremont - Midland Hwy, Granton (single carriageway with south climbing lane).
 1992: Stage Six: Claremont Link Road, Claremont - Black Snake Lane, Granton (dual carriageway).

Lighting
In April 2007, the Department of Infrastructure, Energy and Resources announced plans to replace the sub-standard rusted light poles between Risdon Road and Clearys Gates Road. These are over 40 years old and were the first lights on the Highway, which sparked some concern from the Hobart City Council. They argue that the light poles are in good condition and are a significant feature of the Brooker Highway entrance to Hobart. While the Hobart City Council supports the replacement, they have written to Infrastructure Minister Jim Cox asking him to consider retaining the ornate arms on modern pole bases.

2010 emergency landing incident
On 4 April 2010 18-year-old pilot Patrick Humphries made world headlines by using the normally busy highway as an emergency landing strip after running out of fuel. Humphries was unhurt from the accident and no vehicles were involved in the incident.

2016-17 Elwick Rd/Goodwood Rd and Howard Rd/Renfrew Cir intersection upgrades
Before 2016, Elwick Road and Goodwood Road formed two separate t-junctions on opposite sides of the Brooker Hwy offset by around 100m. The upgrade undertaken between January 2016 and May 2017 aligned Elwick Road with Goodwood Road so that one set of traffic lights could be removed. Extra lanes were also added.

At the same time the adjacent Brooker Highway intersection, Howard Road / Renfrew Circuit was also converted from a five-exit two-lane roundabout to a traffic-lights controlled intersection. The fifth exit from the former Brooker Highway roundabout, Timsbury Road, is now accessed from Howard Rd. The contract for the works, awarded to Hazell Bros was worth $32 million.

Future

In February 2011, the Department of Infrastructure, Energy and Resources revealed intentions to within 3 years "Finalise design options for Domain Highway intersection and increased lane capacity between Domain Highway and Risdon Road". This intention was reaffirmed in an October 2017 submission by the Tasmanian Government to Infrastructure Australia: "Brooker Highway - Risdon Road to Domain Highway - no cost estimate, concept designs to be prepared."

The Department of State Growth released a report titled Hobart Congestion Traffic Analysis 2016 prepared by traffic engineer Keith Midson. Under long-term solutions, the report considered the Liverpool St intersection with the Brooker Hwy, also known as the 'railway roundabout'. The report stated "The railway roundabout is a major cause of congestion... A possible solution is the grade separation of the roundabout."

Recently the government came under pressure from the community to improve pedestrian access over the highway at Goodwood and eliminate the stairs primarily for the benefit of the elderly and handicapped.

Route description
The highway starts in the Hobart CBD at the junction with Eastern Outlet (A3, Tasman Highway), Davey Street (A6) and Macquarie Street (A6). The Tasman Highway heads east over the Tasman Bridge, past the Airport and eventually leads to the east coast of the state, while Davey Street leads towards the Southern Outlet (A6), which in turn heads south towards Kingston and Huonville (Davey and Macquarie are one-way streets - Davey Street flows south-west, and Macquarie Street flows north-east through the CBD).

Apart from the connection to Davey and Macquarie Streets, the major intersection with streets in the CBD is the three-lane roundabout at the north-east end of Liverpool Street. Because it was built in close proximity to the main railway station at the time, the roundabout was, and continues to be, called the "Railway Roundabout".  The sunken garden in the centre of the roundabout functions as a pedestrian thoroughfare, with under-road tunnels connecting to the two sides of Liverpool Street, the original site of the railway station to the north-east, and to the Domain and the suburb of The Glebe to the north-west.  The roundabout was originally just an un-controlled intersection, but with the gradual increase in traffic, particularly from the eastern shore of the Derwent, it was often in grid-lock at peak travel times.  Traffic lights were introduced and alleviated the situation, and later construction of the direct links from the Tasman Bridge to Davey and Macquarie Streets further relieved the pressure.  Other streets from the CBD provide access to the highway, but for much of its length to the city boundary at Risdon Road it is limited access road.

Through the City of Glenorchy the highway has large multi-lane intersections, at Risdon Road, Elwick Road and Derwent Park Road. The highway is in a reasonable condition for its age, but does experience congestion for certain periods during the day.

Trees line the middle nature strip for several kilometres, and fencing prevents pedestrian access at various points. 
The Highway makes its way past The Domain, Cornelian Bay Hockey Grounds, Rugby Park, The Royal Hobart Showgrounds, Tattersalls Park and the Derwent Entertainment Centre.  
At the northern end (at Granton) it connects to the Midland Highway (National Highway 1) (which heads north towards Launceston) and the Lyell Highway (A10) (which takes motorists towards the west coast).

Major intersections

See also 

 List of Highways in Hobart

References

External links 

 Tasmanian Expressways
 Route Numbering

Highways in Hobart